The World Is Full Of Divorced Women is the fifth novel by English author Jackie Collins, published by W. H. Allen Ltd. in 1975.

Plot
In New York City, English journalist Cleo James finds her husband having sex with her best friend, and she knows it's time to end the marriage.  In London, Muffin, the hottest nude model in town, finds her man wants more from her than she can give.

References

1975 British novels
Novels by Jackie Collins
Erotic novels
English-language novels
English novels
W. H. Allen & Co. books